Bryant Field (formerly known as Appeal-Democrat Park, All Seasons RV Stadium, Colusa Casino Stadium and Hard Rock Park) is a stadium in Marysville, California, United States.  It reverted back to its original name of Bryant Field in 2022. 

The stadium is primarily used for baseball and is the home field of the newly-created Marysville Drakes of the Pecos League.  Additionally, Bryant Field served as the home of the Yuba-Sutter Gold Sox (formerly named the Marysville Gold Sox) from 2002 to 2022 and the Yuba City Bears  of the now-defunct Great West League for the 2017 season. The ballpark has a capacity of 4,000 people.  Located on the corner of 14th & B Streets, the stadium has the look and feel of an old-time ballpark with its brickwork trim, sunken dugouts, and outfield wall adorned with billboards.

The stadium served as host for half of William Jessup University's 2015 home baseball schedule.

See also
 Nettleton Stadium
 Arcata Ball Park
 Harry & David Field
 Kiger Stadium
 Miles Field demolished in 2005
 Tiger Field
 Travis Credit Union Park demolished 2008

References

 "Gold Sox to play at Appeal-Democrat Park: Team, newspaper partner on naming rights" (Appeal-Democrat, March 31, 2010)

 "Gold Sox to play at Appeal-Democrat Park: Team, newspaper partner on naming rights" (Appeal-Democrat, March 31, 2010)

 "A-D Park name changed to Colusa Casino Stadium" (Appeal-Democrat, December 31, 2014)

External Links
 Yuba-Sutter Gold Sox official website
 Horizon Air Summer Series website

Baseball venues in California
Marysville, California
Minor league baseball venues
College baseball venues in the United States
1937 establishments in California
Sports venues completed in 1937